Rotwand ("Red Wall" or "Red Face") or variation, is the name of several well-known peaks in the Alps:

 Sextener Rotwand, in the Sexten Dolomites of South Tyrol
 Rotwand (Rosengarten Group), in the Rosengarten Group near the Karer Pass in South Tyrol
 Rotwand (Allgäu Alps), in the Allgäu Alps in Tyrol
 Rotwand (Bavaria), in the Mangfall Mountains near Bayrischzell in Bavaria
 Rotwandlspitze, a mountain in Bavaria, Germany
 Rote Wand, a mountain in Austria

See also

 
 
 
 
 
 
 Redwall (disambiguation)
 Wand (disambiguation)
 Rote (disambiguation)
 Rot (disambiguation)